Alexander Sergeyvich Dambaev (born 16 June 1989 in Zabaykalsky Krai) is a Russian athlete who competes in compound archery. He has won medals at the major World Archery Federation competitions, the World Archery Championships and the FITA Archery World Cup, and achieved his highest world ranking of 20 in 2011.

References

External links
 The sports.org profile

1989 births
Living people
Russian male archers
Buryat sportspeople
Sportspeople from Zabaykalsky Krai
World Archery Championships medalists
Universiade medalists in archery
Universiade gold medalists for Russia
Medalists at the 2011 Summer Universiade
Medalists at the 2017 Summer Universiade
21st-century Russian people